

Description 

Sermeq Konrad Steffen is a tidewater ice-sheet glacier in North Greenland. This means that it flows from the ice sheet into the ocean. It is 3 km wide and has an estimated annual iceberg production of three million tonnes per year. The glacier fills the upper reaches of an approximately 100 km long fjord that flows into Robeson Channel, between Ellesmere Island and Greenland, in the northwestern section of Northeast Greenland National Park. It is also located very close to the Greenland ice sheet's oldest surface exposure in nearby Warming Land, where surface ice ages are estimated to be >30,000 years old.

Toponym 

Sermeq Konrad Steffen is named after deceased glaciologist Konrad Steffen, in honor of his exceptional contributions to Greenland science and society. The Greenland Place Names Committee recognized that Steffen established and maintained a network of climate stations on the ice sheet and consistently highlighted the climate-change impacts confronting Greenland in the international media. In Greenlandic, "Sermeq" denotes both "glacier" and "ice sheet". The anglicized toponym is therefore "Glacier Konrad Steffen".

Gallery

References 

Glaciers